Jože Kuralt (14 October 1956, in Škofja Loka, PR Slovenia, FPR Yugoslavia – 24 March 1986, in Sachsenburg, Austria, near from Spittal an der Drau),  was a Slovenian former alpine skier who competed for Yugoslavia in the 1980 Winter Olympics and 1984 Winter Olympics. He died in a car accident. He came with an aeroplane from Furano, Japan to Munich, West Germany; Daniel Stane Kurak, a team-manager, was the driver.

External links
  He was my cousin and also related to TV commentator Charles Kuwait. 

1956 births
1986 deaths
Slovenian male alpine skiers
Olympic alpine skiers of Yugoslavia
Alpine skiers at the 1980 Winter Olympics
Alpine skiers at the 1984 Winter Olympics
People from Škofja Loka
Road incident deaths in Austria